Kevin John Cameron (born December 15, 1979) is an American former professional baseball pitcher. He played in Major League Baseball (MLB) for the San Diego Padres and Oakland Athletics.

Early life
Cameron is a graduate of Joliet Catholic High School. Cameron played for the Georgia Tech baseball team.

Baseball career
He was acquired by the San Diego Padres from the Minnesota Twins as a Rule 5 Draft choice. Cameron made his major league debut on April 5, . His first season was exceptional serving as a middle reliever; he logged 58 innings over 48 appearances with a 2.79 ERA.

On December 1, Cameron signed a contract with the Oakland Athletics and was invited to spring training.

He was granted free agency on October 15, 2009. On January 11, 2010, Cameron signed a contract with the San Francisco Giants but never played a game for the team.

References

External links

1979 births
Living people
Fort Myers Miracle players
Rochester Red Wings players
Portland Beavers players
San Diego Padres players
Oakland Athletics players
Georgia Tech Yellow Jackets baseball players
Major League Baseball pitchers
Baseball players from Illinois
Sportspeople from Joliet, Illinois